Ân Thi is a rural district of Hưng Yên province in the Red River Delta region of Vietnam. As of 2003 the district had a population of 135,423. The district covers an area of 128 km². The district capital lies at Ân Thi.

References

Districts of Hưng Yên province